María Helena Doering (born November 16, 1962) is a Colombian actress and model.

Doering was born to a German-Bolivian father and Colombian mother. She studied in Colombia, London, and Italy and speaks fluent French, English, Italian and Spanish. She started her career as an actress by appearing in a Kolynos (toothpaste) commercial, and a commercial for Coffee Delight. At 13 years of age, she worked with some of the most important photographers of Cali (her hometown): Fernell Franco, Oswaldo Lopez, Micky Calero and Jaime Andres Orozco. In 1980 she traveled to Italy and stayed there for 13 years. In 1986 she was discovered by an Alfa Romeo executive while working as a translator at a Fiat event, and joined the Fashion Models Agency in Milan She worked in Italy with fashion Photographers as Gabriele Balestra and Gaetano Mansi. Doering appeared in 67 television commercials in five years and worked in Japan, Germany, Spain and France. In 1993, she was contacted by Julio Sanchez Cristo to star in La Maldicion del Paraiso in Colombia.

She is now a successful actress in her home country.

Aside from acting and modeling, Doering also sings, but not as a professional. During her free time she likes to do floral arrangements, ride horses and read biographies and books about history. She is fascinated by Italian literature.

Filmography

Films 
Mi abuelo, mi papá y yo (2005)...Esperanza Arias
El Escritor de Telenovelas (2011)... Anabella
La Luciernaga (2013)... Mercedes
Todas Para Uno (2014)
Mariposas Verdes (2017)... Ana

Telenovelas
 La Ley del Corazón 2 (2018)
Sitiados 2 (2017)
Venganza / Revancha (2016)... Victoria Piedrahita
Pobres Rico (2012)... Ana María Fernández de Rico
 La Pola-Amar La Hizo Libre (2010)...Eusebia de Valencia (RCN)
 Bella Calamidades (2009)...Lorenza de Machado (Telemundo)
 El penúltimo beso (2008/2009)...Lupe Preciado de Izquierdo (RCN)
 Victoria (2007)...Helena de Cárdenas (Telemundo)
 Hasta que la plata nos separe (2006)...Rosaura Suárez de De la Peña (RCN)
 Decisiones (2005)...various characters
 La Saga, Negocio de Familia (2004)... Marlene (Caracol TV)
 Te Voy a Enseñar a Querer (2004)...Isabel de Mendéz/Orquídea (Telemundo)
 La Venganza (2002)...Helena Fontana Viso (Telemundo)
 Milagros de Amor (2002)...Catalina Pizarro de Hansen (RCN)
 Adrian (Luzbel) Esta de Visita (2001)...Elsa Estrada de Franco (Telemundo)
 La Viuda de Blanco (1996)...Alicia Guardiola Vda. de Blanco
 Amor, Amor (1995)...?
 Las Aguas Mansas (1994)...Melissa Ferrer
 La Maldicion del paraiso(1993)...Camila Fontana

Teatro 
 La Ratonera (2002/2003)
Técnicas para Amar(2017)...Dora

External links
 Telemundo Website
 Official "Victoria" Website

Gallery of images

Colombian film actresses
Colombian telenovela actresses
Colombian people of Bolivian descent
Colombian people of German descent
1962 births
Living people
20th-century Colombian actresses
21st-century Colombian actresses